The 1936 Jersey Air Disaster occurred on 31 July 1936 when the Cloud of Iona, a Saro Cloud flying boat operated by Guernsey Airways, ditched into the sea off Jersey, Channel Islands, during a flight between Guernsey and Jersey. Investigators believed that the flying boat failed to reach its destination due to engine failure. All ten on board were assumed to have died.

Accident
Guernsey Airways was formed in 1934 as a subsidiary of Jersey Airways to operate services between St Peter Port, Guernsey and St Brelade's Bay in Jersey. On 31 July 1936 the Cloud of Iona failed to arrive in Jersey. It had departed around 19:00 and the journey should have taken 20 minutes.  The weather was poor and visibility was reduced by drizzle. At 22:00 the St Helier lifeboat was launched to search for the flying boat, it searched all night without finding anything. In the morning a number of French military aircraft from Cherbourg and Royal Air Force aircraft joined the search from the air, an RAF seaplane reported sighting fabric and plywood in the sea. On 2 August three motorboats from Jersey returned with wreckage including wood, cushions and fabric which was identified as coming from the Isle of Iona. An official from Channel Islands Airways the parent company of both Jersey and Guernsey Airways made a statement:

Sighting
Two passengers on the Great Western Railway mailboat St Helier reported seeing an aircraft in the sea about half a mile away from the ship. They reported that the aircraft propellers were turning and they expected it was going to take off. The two passengers crossed to the other side of the boat as they realised the aircraft would pass across the bows. They didn't see the aircraft on the other side and assumed it had taken off in the mist. Officials checked the bow of the ship to see if it had hit the flying boat but no marks were found.

Wreckage and bodies
On 3 August it was reported that an 18 ft long wing section had been found near Minquiers Reef and a float had washed up on a French beach at Annonville. The following few days bodies were washed ashore on the French coast.  Two weeks later, on the 14 August, two Jersey fisherman found the wreckage (fuselage and engines) of the Cloud of Iona on the rocks 10 miles from Jersey.

Investigation
It was concluded that, following total engine failure, the pilot was able to land safely on the sea and, although everyone onboard had time to put on their lifejacket, the aircraft was overturned and broken up by the sea and everyone drowned.

Aircraft
The aircraft involved was a twin-engined  Saro Cloud flying boat built in 1932 and registered as G-ABXW. It was original operated by British Flying Boats Limited who named it the Cloud of Iona, before it was sold to Guernsey Airways in September 1934.

Aftermath
The inter-island seaplane service was suspended and did not operate again after the accident. The Cloud of Iona was to have been fitted with wireless equipment the week after the accident. In January 1937 the airline was prosecuted, in that they permitted the machine to be used on July 29, 30 and 31 without an approved wireless installation. They were fined £300.

Casualties
All on board were killed, they included five English holidaymakers and three people from Guernsey as well as the two crew (a pilot and mechanic).

References

Aviation accidents and incidents in 1936
July 1936 events
Aviation accidents and incidents in the Channel Islands
Disasters in Jersey